Jorge Huamán  (born 11 April 1977 in Callao) is a Peruvian footballer is a former  Peruvian footballer who played as a defender.

Club career
Huamán played for most of his career with Sport Boys, Sporting Cristal and Universidad San Martín in the Primera División Peruana. He also had a spell with Veria in the Greek Super League.

International career
Huamán made twelve appearances for the senior Peru national football team from 1998 to 2005.

References

External links

1977 births
Living people
Sportspeople from Callao
Association football defenders
Peruvian footballers
Peru international footballers
Sport Boys footballers
Veria F.C. players
Sporting Cristal footballers
Estudiantes de Medicina footballers
Club Universitario de Deportes footballers
Alianza Atlético footballers
Club Deportivo Universidad de San Martín de Porres players
Universidad Técnica de Cajamarca footballers
Peruvian expatriate footballers
Expatriate footballers in Greece
2000 CONCACAF Gold Cup players